Mário Jorge da Silva Pinto Fernandes (born 24 July 1961), known as Mário Jorge, is a Portuguese retired footballer who played as a left midfielder.

Club career
Born in Ponta Delgada, Azores, Mário Jorge made his professional debut with Sporting CP at the age of 18, appearing in one match in 1979–80 as the Lisbon club won the Primeira Liga championship. He was already an important midfield player as the team conquered it again two seasons later, the last for the following 18 years.

After only 12 games in 1988–89, Mário Jorge left Sporting and signed for S.C. Beira-Mar in the same league, but returned to where he had come from at the end of the campaign, again being rarely used. He concluded his career in 1995 after stints with two other sides from the capital, C.F. Estrela da Amadora and G.D. Estoril Praia, both in the Segunda Liga; he later worked as sporting director at the latter.

International career
Mário Jorge earned nine caps for Portugal, seven of those coming after the 1986 FIFA World Cup following the defection of practically all of the national team squad due to the infamous Saltillo Affair. His debut, however, took place on 8 June 1983, when he featured the full 90 minutes in a 4–0 friendly loss against Brazil in Coimbra.

References

External links

1961 births
Living people
People from Ponta Delgada
Portuguese footballers
Association football midfielders
Primeira Liga players
Liga Portugal 2 players
Sporting CP footballers
S.C. Beira-Mar players
C.F. Estrela da Amadora players
G.D. Estoril Praia players
Portugal youth international footballers
Portugal under-21 international footballers
Portugal international footballers